The 1975 Japan Open Tennis Championships was a combined men's and women's tennis tournament played on hard courts. The men's events were part of the 1975 Commercial Union Assurance Grand Prix and took place at the Denen Coliseum in Tokyo, Japan. The tournament was held from 2 November through 8 November 1975. Raúl Ramírez and Kazuko Sawamatsu won the singles titles.

Finals

Men's singles
 Raúl Ramírez defeated  Manuel Orantes 6–4, 7–5, 6–3
 It was Ramirez' 4th singles title of the year and the 7th of his career.

Women's singles
 Kazuko Sawamatsu defeated  Ann Kiyomura 6–2, 3–6, 6–1
 It was Sawamatsu's 1st singles title of the year and the 2nd and last of his career.

Men's doubles
 Brian Gottfried /  Raúl Ramírez defeated  Juan Gisbert Sr. /  Manuel Orantes, 7–6, 6–4

Women's doubles
 Ann Kiyomura /  Kazuko Sawamatsu defeated  Kayoko Fukuoka /  Kiyomi Nomura 6–2, 6–3

References

External links
 Official website
  Association of Tennis Professionals (ATP) tournament profile

Japan Open Tennis Championships
Japan Open Tennis Championships
Japan Open (tennis)
Japan Open Tennis Championships
Japan Open Tennis Championships
1975 WTA Tour